The Basketball League Belgium Division I Coach of the Year (Coach van het Jaar in Dutch) is an annual Basketball League Belgium Division I award given to the best coach of the league. The award is handed out after the end of the regular season.

Winners

Notes

References

Coach